Audembert is a commune in the Pas-de-Calais department in the Hauts-de-France region in northern France.

Geography

Population

Sights
 The church of St. Martin, dating from the nineteenth century.
 The eighteenth-century Château de Warcove.
 Two 17th-century manor houses at Noirbernes and Warcove.

See also
Communes of the Pas-de-Calais department

References

Communes of Pas-de-Calais